Robin Chan Yau-hing, GBM, GBS, JP (6 November 193218 April 2022), also known as  , or Rabin Sophonpanich was a Chinese-born Hong Kong businessman of Thai descent. He was the eldest son of Chin Sophonpanich (founder and former president of Bangkok Bank), and served as the chairman of the Asia Financial Group. 

Robin Chan was born in Chiuyang, Swatow, Kwangtung, Republic of China. He had two sons, Stephen Tan and Bernard Chan, who were executive director and president of the Asia Financial Group and its main subsidiary, Asia Insurance respectively.

References

External links
Hong Kong - Thailand Business Council
Bernard Chan & Mum
Father Chen Bichen Overseas Chinese Light (in Chinese)

1932 births
2022 deaths
Robin Chan
Hong Kong businesspeople
Chinese people of Thai descent
Hong Kong people of Thai descent
Recipients of the Gold Bauhinia Star
Recipients of the Grand Bauhinia Medal
Chaoshanese people
Members of the Selection Committee of Hong Kong
Members of the Preparatory Committee for the Hong Kong Special Administrative Region
Delegates to the 9th National People's Congress from Hong Kong
Delegates to the 10th National People's Congress from Hong Kong
People from Shantou